Eller may refer to
Eller (surname)
Düsseldorf-Eller, an urban borough of Düsseldorf, Germany
Ediger-Eller, a community on the Moselle in Rhineland-Palatinate, Germany
Eller (Rhume), a river of Thuringia and Lower Saxony, Germany
Weilroder Eller, a headstream of the Eller
Geroder Eller, a headstream of the Eller
Eller (sculpture), sculpture by Metin Yurdanur in Abdi İpekçi Park, Ankara
Eller Beck, a river in North Yorkshire, England
Eller College of Management, a business school at the University of Arizona, USA